Mahmood Khan Achakzai (born 14 December 1948). Mahmood Khan Achakzai completed his Engineering degree from the Peshawar University of Engineering and Technology. In 7th National Congress of Pashtunkhwa Milli Awami Party on 19,20 December 2022 Mahmood khan Achakzai re elected as the Chairman Of PkMAP.

Early life and education
Achakzai was born on 14 December 1948 to Abdul Samad Khan Achakzai. He received BSc degree in Engineering from University of Engineering and Technology, Peshawar in 1971.

Political career
Achakzai is a Pashtun nationalist who was elected as the chairman of the Pashtunkhwa National Awami Party (PNAP) following the assassination of his father Abdul Samad Khan Achakzai in a bomb attack in Quetta in 1973. PNAP and the Pakhtunkhwa Mazdoor Kisan Party (PMKP) of Sher Ali Bacha reached an agreement in 1986. As a result of this settlement, the Pashtunkhwa Milli Awami Party (PMAP) was created in March 1989 at a meeting in Quetta. Bacha was elected as the General Secretary of PMAP while Mahmood Khan Achakzai was the chairman.

Achakzai was elected as a member of the Provincial Assembly of Balochistan in a by election. Achakzai was elected as a member of National Assembly of Pakistan in 1993 Pakistani general election from Quetta constituency. Reportedly, he had won his first election with the support of Pakistan Muslim League (N). Achakzai lost the National Assembly seat in 1997 Pakistani general election.

Achakzai was re-elected as a member of National Assembly of Pakistan in 2002 Pakistani general election from the NA- 262 constituency however lost in the NA-259 (Quetta) constituency. In 2007, Achakzai parted ways with his ally PML-N and formed an alliance with the Awami National Party. In 2008, he formed an alliance with All Parties Democratic Movement and boycotted 2008 Pakistani general election to deny the legitimacy of then President of Pakistan Pervez Musharraf. Although he boycotted the polls, he remained active in the politics.

In February 2013, it was reported that Achakzai is being considered for the post of caretaker prime minister of Pakistan prior to 2013 Pakistani general election, but he refused to become the caretaker prime minister due to reason that he intended to contest the upcoming general elections.

Achakzai ran for seat of National Assembly from two constituencies, NA-259-Quetta and NA-262-Qilla Abdullah, in 2013 Pakistani general election. Achakzai was supported by Pakistan Muslim League (N) in Quetta constituency. Achakzai won the NA-259 Quetta.

From 11 to 14 March 2022, he was part of the Pashtun National Jirga, which was held in Bannu, Khyber Pakhtunkhwa to discuss the critical issues faced by the Pashtuns in Pakistan and Afghanistan.

See also
Pashtun nationalism

References

1948 births
Living people
Pashtunkhwa Milli Awami Party politicians
Pakistani MNAs 1993–1996
People from Killa Abdullah District
Politicians from Balochistan, Pakistan
University of Engineering & Technology, Peshawar alumni
People from Quetta
Pashtun people
Pashtun nationalists
Mahmood
Pakistani MNAs 2013–2018